The Ones Down There is a 1926 German silent film directed by Victor Janson and starring Maly Delschaft, Aud Egede-Nissen, and Walter Rilla.

The film's sets were designed by the art director Jacek Rotmil.

Cast

References

Bibliography

External links

1926 films
Films of the Weimar Republic
Films directed by Victor Janson
German silent feature films
Social realism in film
Films set in Berlin
German black-and-white films